Walter Orr Woods (October 31, 1873 – June 7, 1951) was United States Register of the Treasury from October 1, 1927, to January 17, 1929 and Treasurer of the United States from January 18, 1929, to May 31, 1933.  Before becoming Treasurer, he was a member of the War Loan Board staff.  As Treasurer he supervised the change from the large to the smaller sized U.S. currency now in use.

References

Treasurers of the United States
People from Concordia, Kansas
1873 births
1951 deaths
People from Carlinville, Illinois